Oddfellows Cafe and Bar is a restaurant in Seattle's Capitol Hill neighborhood, in the United States.

Description 
The American/New American restaurant serves breakfast, lunch and dinner; the menu has included biscuits, French toast, pastries, paninis, salads and soups. The Oddball sandwich has marinara meatballs, provolone, Parmesan, and roasted chicken. Fodor's says, "Service is sometimes a bit lacking, but the huge communal-style seating, Capitol Hill–hipster-chic vibe, cold brews, and festive music make this a fun place to watch the day go by or spend an evening out."

The restaurant also serves coffee during the day and cocktails and wine at night. Conde Naste Traveler has described the interior as "airy" and "white-washed".

History 
Owner Linda Derschang opened the restaurant in 2008. Oddfellows has participated in Seattle Restaurant Week. During the COVID-19 pandemic, Oddfellows built a street patio. Bella Pham, Benjamin Hubbard, and Stacy Milrany painted murals on plywood on the restaurant's exterior during the pandemic.

Little Oddfellows, located within the adjacent Elliott Bay Book Company, has been described as the restaurant's "sister cafe".

Reception 
Leonardo David Raymundo included the restaurant in Eater Seattle 2017 overview of "Low-Stakes First Date Spots in Seattle". He wrote, "With big, open windows facing the east and a collection of vintage antiques littered about like a 1930s garage sale, Linda Derschang’s Oddfellows is a contemporary homage to the past. All the egg dishes here are legit, but the signature classic is baked eggs with ham and cheese." Emma Banks included Oddfellows in Thrillist's 2022 list of "The Best Patios for Eating and Drinking Outside in Seattle".

See also

 List of New American restaurants

References

External links 

 
 Oddfellows Cafe & Bar at Zomato

2008 establishments in Washington (state)
Capitol Hill, Seattle
New American restaurants in Seattle
Restaurants established in 2008